Prince George William of Hanover may refer to:
Prince George William of Hanover (1915–2006), son of Ernest Augustus, Duke of Brunswick
Prince George William of Hanover (1880–1912), son of Ernest Augustus, Crown Prince of Hanover